Twisted Metal is an upcoming American post-apocalyptic action comedy television series created by Rhett Reese and Paul Wernick. Based on the vehicular combat video game franchise of the same name published by Sony Interactive Entertainment, the series stars Anthony Mackie, Stephanie Beatriz, Thomas Haden Church, Will Arnett, Richard Cabral and Samoa Joe.  The half-hour series is about a driver who takes a job to deliver a package across a post-apocalyptic wastelands while being chased by marauders.

Development by Sony Pictures Television and PlayStation Productions began in May 2019 with a full season being ordered by Peacock in February 2022. Production took place in New Orleans from May to August 2022. The series is set to air on Peacock on an unannounced date in 2023.

Premise
In a post-apocalyptic wasteland, John Doe, a talkative milkman with amnesia, is given a mission to traverse the desolate world to deliver a cryptic package in order to stay alive. Alongside the assistance of Quiet, a rash car thief, Doe faces a life-altering opportunity but must confront ruthless marauders in deadly and destructive vehicles to secure a chance at a better future.

Cast

Main
 Anthony Mackie as John Doe
 Stephanie Beatriz as Quiet
 Thomas Haden Church as Agent Stone
 Samoa Joe as Sweet Tooth
 Will Arnett as the voice of Sweet Tooth
 Richard Cabral as Loud

Recurring
 Neve Campbell as Raven
 Tahj Vaughans as Mike
 Mike Mitchell as Stu
 Lou Beatty Jr. as Tommy
 Michael Carollo 
 Chloe Fineman

Production

Development
In May 2019, during an investor relations presentation, Sony Pictures Television confirmed that a television series based on video game series, Twisted Metal was in "advanced development" alongside PlayStation Productions.  By February 2021, the series was announced with Will Arnett, Rhett Reese, Michael Jonathan Smith and Paul Wernick on board to executive produced. Smith serves as showrunner and wrote the series based on an original take by Reese and Wernick.  In February 2022, the half-hour action comedy was greenlit by Peacock. In April, Kitao Sakurai joined the series as an executive producer in addition to directing multiple episodes.

Casting and characters
In September 2021, Anthony Mackie was the first to be cast and also serves as one of the executive producers. He plays John Doe, a "smart-ass milkman" who has amnesia and he gets a once-in-a-lifetime opportunity, only if he can survives attacks of vehicular combat. In May 2022, Stephanie Beatriz and Thomas Haden Church was cast in starring roles as Quiet and Agent Stone, respectively. Quiet is a car thief that forms an antagonistic bond with John Doe. Agent Stone is described as "a cold and unyielding post-apocalyptic highway patrolman who rules the roads".  Neve Campbell was cast in a recurring role as Raven. 

In June, Arnett joined the cast, voicing the character Sweet Tooth from the video game series. Sweet Tooth is a "hulking killer in a ghoulish clown mask who prowls the streets of "Lost Vegas" in a weaponized ice cream truck. Wrestler Samoa Joe physically portrays Sweet Tooth.  

Richard Cabral was cast as Beatriz's overprotective brother, Loud.  Tahj Vaughans and Mike Mitchell portray best friends, Mike and Stu. Lou Beatty Jr plays Tommy, "a grizzled and weathered cartographer who knows the dangers of the Wild Midwest". Michael Carollo and Chloe Fineman have undisclosed roles.

Filming
On an estimated budget of $72.3 million, season one began principal photography in May 2022, in New Orleans, and wrapped that August.  Shooting in New Orleans in the summer came with some challenges with Smith telling NOLA.com, "We dealt with lightning delays, hurricane threats, extreme heat and cars that wouldn't do as they were told".

Release
Twisted Metal is scheduled to premiere on Peacock on an undisclosed date in 2023.

References

External links
 

Peacock (streaming service) original programming
Upcoming comedy television series
Upcoming drama television series
American action television series
American comedy-drama television series
American television shows based on video games
Live action television shows based on video games
Television series by Universal Television
Television series by Sony Pictures Television
Twisted Metal
Television shows about death games
Post-apocalyptic television series
Works based on Sony Interactive Entertainment video games
English-language television shows
PlayStation Productions
Television shows filmed in New Orleans